was a member of the Japanese Communist Party. He was born in 1899 in Ichikawa, Chiba Prefecture. He was the son of a tatami mat maker. After graduating primary school in 1912, he went to Tokyo to work in a wine shop. In 1917, he worked in a celluloid factory in Kamedo section of Tokyo. He organized the National Celluloid Workers Union in Tokyo in 1919. He joined the Japanese Communist Party soon after its establishment in 1922. In March 1927, he went to Moscow to represent the JCP at the Comintern, and the eighth enlarged plenum of the ECCI. That same year, Watanabe returned to Japan and took over the leadership of the party. In March 1928, he was elected chairman of the JCP central committee. During Watanabe's lifetime, he married Tanno Setsu, a labour activist, and member of the Communist Party.

Watanabe escaped Japan during mass arrests on March 15, 1928. He traveled to Formosa (modern-day Taiwan) disguised as a dry goods merchant. He killed himself in Keelung while being pursued by the police.

He used the alias "Asano" during his years in the Communist Party.

Further reading
Revolutionary Worker Watanabe Masanosuke and the Japanese Communist Party," Asian Profile 3.4 (1975)

References

Japanese communists
1899 births
1928 deaths
People from Ichikawa, Chiba
1928 suicides
Suicides by firearm
Suicides in Taiwan